Harald Alfred Rehder (June 5, 1907 – November 10, 1996) was an American malacologist. His wife, Lois Corea Rehder (1911–1988), was also a malacologist.

He (and/or his wife) named 172 marine taxa according to the World Register of Marine Species

He graduated from Bowdoin College (BA), Harvard University (MA), George Washington University (PhD).

Works
 Rehder H. A. (July) 1952. Harold John Finlay, 1901-1951. The Nautilus 66(1): 30-31.
 Florence A. Ruhoff (1973), Bibliography and Zoological Taxa of Paul Bartsch, Biographical Sketch by Harald A. Rehder, Smithsonian Contributions to Zoology, Number 143
 M. J. Sweeney & M. J. Harasewych, 1999. Harald A. Rehder (1907-1996): biographical sketch and malacological contributions. The Nautilus 113(4): 127-150, portraits

See also
 List of malacologists

References

American malacologists
1907 births
1996 deaths
20th-century American zoologists
Conchologists
Bowdoin College alumni
George Washington University alumni
Harvard University alumni